Lazarette may refer to:

Lazarette, a synonym for a leprosarium or leper hospital
Lazarette, the part of a ship used to hold the vessel's rudder post and steering gear